Dysoxylum pettigrewianum, commonly known as spur mahogany, spurwood, or Cairns satinwood, is a large tree in the family Meliaceae. It is native to the rainforests of Malesia, Papuasia and Queensland. In Queensland it occurs only in a small part of the northeast coast.

Description
The rough flaky bark is brown with numerous lenticels.

The large whorled leaves are imparipinnate with between 7 and 15 leaflets. The petiole is sharply but very shortly winged and is swollen at its junction with the branch. The leaflets vary in size, the proximal ones are relatively small and the distal ones larger.

Appearing in December and January, they carry numerous small fragrant flowers which are sessile and creamy white in colour.

They are dark brown on the outside with a warty appearance. At maturity they split to reveal the orange coloured interior with up to four seeds.

Taxonomy
The species was first described by the colonial botanist of Queensland Frederick Manson Bailey, from specimens collected from "Scrubs at the base of Bellenden-Ker Range and the Barron River." His description was published in Botany Bulletin. Department of Agriculture, Queensland 5: 9 in July 1892.

Etymology
The species epithet was chosen by Bailey to honour the Brisbane businessman and politician William Pettigrew. Bailey wrote: "After the Hon. William Pettigrew, who has always taken a deep interest in Queensland timbers."

Distribution and habitat
In Australia Dysoxylum pettigrewianum grows in well developed rainforest from just north of Hope Vale to the Paluma Range, just north of Townsville. It is also found in the Maluku Islands, New Guinea, and the Solomon Islands.

Ecology
The fruits are eaten by cassowaries (Casuarius spp.) who swallow the entire fruit, and by metallic starlings (Aplonis metallica), who extract and swallow just the seeds. The leaves are eaten by Lumholtz's tree-kangaroo (Dendrolagus lumholtzi).

The northern leaf-tailed gecko (Saltuarius cornutus) often hunts for prey in the scaly bark where it is well camouflaged.

Conservation
This species is listed by the Queensland Department of Environment and Science as least concern. , it has not been assessed by the IUCN.

Uses
It is red/brown in colour and is used as a general purpose and cabinet timber. It was once popular for boat building.

Growing too large for the average garden, it is suitable for planting in parks and public gardens, making a useful shade tree. Young plants need shelter, and the species does best in a well-drained acidic soil.

Gallery

References

External links
 
 
 View a map of historical sightings of this species at the Australasian Virtual Herbarium
 View observations of this species on iNaturalist
 View images of this species on Flickriver

pettigrewianum
Flora of Queensland
Flora of New Guinea
Flora of Malesia
Trees of the Solomon Islands
Trees of Australia
Sapindales of Australia
Plants described in 1892
Taxa named by Frederick Manson Bailey